The 2009 European Weightlifting Championships were held in Bucharest, Romania from 3 April to 12 April 2009. It was the 88th edition of the event, which was first staged in 1896.

Men's events

Women's events

Medals tables 

Ranking by "Big" (Total result) medals

References

External links 
 Official results
 IWF results
 IWF start list

E
European Weightlifting Championships
European Weightlifting Championships
European Weightlifting Championships